The following outline is provided as an overview of and topical guide to Taiwan:

Taiwan – a country in East Asia, officially named the Republic of China (ROC). Originally based in mainland China, the ROC now governs the island of Taiwan, which makes up over 99% of its territory, as well as Penghu, Kinmen, Matsu, and other minor islands. Taipei is the seat of the central government. Following the Chinese civil war, the Chinese Communist Party took full control of mainland China and founded the People's Republic of China (PRC) in 1949. The ROC relocated its government to Taiwan, and its jurisdiction became limited to Taiwan and its surrounding islands. In 1971, the PRC assumed China's seat at the United Nations, which the ROC originally occupied. During the latter half of the 20th century, Taiwan experienced rapid economic growth and industrialization and is now an advanced industrial economy. In the 1980s and early 1990s, Taiwan evolved into a multi-party democracy with universal suffrage. Taiwan is one of the Four Asian Tigers and a member of the WTO and APEC. The 19th-largest economy in the world, its high-tech industry plays a key role in the global economy.

General reference 
 Pronunciation: 
 
 
 Common English state names:  Taiwan; archaic Formosa
 Official English state names:  Republic of China
 Common endonym(s): 臺灣 / 台灣 (Táiwān; Tâi-oân)
 Official endonym(s): 臺灣 / 台灣 – 中華民國 (Zhōnghuá Mínguó; Tiong-hôa Bîn-kok)
 Adjectival(s): Taiwanese (disambiguation) 
 Demonym(s): Taiwanese
 Etymology: Taiwan#Name
 International rankings of Taiwan
 ISO country codes:  TW, TWN, 158
 ISO region codes:  See ISO 3166-2:TW
 Internet country code top-level domain:  .tw

Geography of Taiwan 

 Taiwan is:
 a common name used for the Republic of China since the 1970s, to avoid confusion with the People's Republic of China (commonly known as China)
 also the name of the Island of Taiwan (Formosa)
 Location:
 Northern Hemisphere and Eastern Hemisphere
 Eurasia (but not on the mainland)
 Asia
 East Asia
 Pacific Ocean
 East China Sea
 Philippine Sea
Bashi Channel
 South China Sea
 Taiwan Strait
 Time zone:  National Standard Time (UTC+08:00)
 Extreme points of Taiwan
 High:  Yushan 
 Low:  Pacific Ocean 0 m
 Land boundaries:  none
 Coastline:  1,566 km
 Population of Taiwan: 23,503,349 people (May 2016 estimate) - 53rd most populous country
 Area of Taiwan:  - 134th largest country
 Atlas of Taiwan

Environment of Taiwan 

 Climate of Taiwan
 Geology of Taiwan
 National parks of Taiwan
 Wildlife of Taiwan
 Endemic species of Taiwan
 Fauna of Taiwan
 Birds of Taiwan
 Mammals of Taiwan
 Formosan rock macaque
 Flora of Taiwan

Geographic features of Taiwan 

 Hot springs in Taiwan - Taiwan has one of the highest concentrations of hot springs in the World.
 Islands of Taiwan
Taiwan
 Mountains in Taiwan
 Volcanoes in Taiwan
 Rivers in Taiwan
Taiwan Strait
 World Heritage Sites in Taiwan: None

Regions of Taiwan 

Alishan National Scenic Area
 Metropolitan areas in Taiwan

Ecoregions of Taiwan 

 South Taiwan monsoon rain forests
 Taiwan subtropical evergreen forests

Administrative divisions of Taiwan 

 Administrative division types
 Special municipalities (6) and Provincial cities (3)
 Districts (170)
 Counties (13)
 County-administered cities (14) and Townships (184)
 Six special municipalities: Kaohsiung, New Taipei, Taichung, Tainan, Taipei, and Taoyuan.
 Three provincial cities: Chiayi, Hsinchu, Keelung.
 13 counties: Changhua, Chiayi, Hsinchu, Hualien, Kinmen, Lienchiang, Miaoli, Nantou, Penghu, Pingtung, Taitung, Yilan and Yunlin.
 List of cities in Taiwan

Demography of Taiwan

Government and politics of Taiwan 

 Form of government: semi-presidential representative democratic republic
 Capital of the Republic of China: Taipei

Elections in Taiwan 

 Presidential elections in Taiwan
 1996 - 2000 - 2004 - 2008 - 2012 - 2016 - 2020
Legislative elections in Taiwan
 Legislative Yuan: 1969 - 1972 - 1975 - 1980 - 1983 - 1986 - 1989 - 1992 - 1995 - 1998 - 2001 - 2004 - 2008 - 2012 - 2016 - 2020
 National Assembly: 1969 - 1972 - 1980 - 1986 - 1991 - 1996 - 2005 (defunct)
Referendums in Taiwan

Taiwan policy and ideology
Taiwanization and Desinicization
Taiwanese nationalism
Tangwai
Taiwan independence movement
Formosan League for Reemancipation
Sinicization
Chinese nationalism
Three Principles of the People
Chinese unification
Iron rice bowl
Iron vote
Irredentism
228 Hand-in-Hand Rally

Political parties

Nationally represented parties 
Democratic Progressive Party
Kuomintang
New Power Party
People First Party (Taiwan)
Non-Partisan Solidarity Union

Other parties 
Civil Party (Taiwan)
Green Party Taiwan
Minkuotang
Natural Law Party
New Party (Taiwan)
Peasant Party (Taiwan)
Taiwan Independence Party
Taiwan Solidarity Union
Trees Party

Branches of government 

The government of the Republic of China has five branches, called "yuan".

Leadership 

 Head of state: President, Tsai Ing-wen
 Vice President: Chen Chien-jen

Executive Yuan 

 Head of government: Premier of the Republic of China, Lin Chuan
 The Cabinet (Executive Yuan)
 Ministry of the Interior
 Ministry of Foreign Affairs
 Ministry of National Defense
 Ministry of Finance
 Ministry of Education
 Ministry of Justice
 Ministry of Economic Affairs
 Ministry of Transportation and Communications
 Ministry of Health and Welfare
 Ministry of Culture
 Ministry of Labor
 Ministry of Science and Technology

Legislative Yuan 

 Legislative Yuan is a unicameral parliament

Judicial Yuan 

 Supreme Court of the Republic of China

Examination Yuan

Control Yuan

Foreign relations of Taiwan 

 Cross-Strait relations
 Chinese unification
 Chinese Taipei
 One Country on Each Side
 Diplomatic missions of Taiwan
 Four Noes and One Without
 Four-Stage Theory of the Republic of China
 Free Area of the Republic of China
 ISO 3166-2:TW
 List of Chinese Taipei Representatives to APEC
 Political status of Taiwan
 Sino-Pacific relations
 Taiwan independence movement
 Taiwan passport
 Taiwan-United States relations
American Institute in Taiwan
 Six Assurances
 Taiwan Relations Act
 Visa policy of Taiwan

International organization membership 
The Republic of China is a member of:
Asian Development Bank (ADB) (as Chinese Taipei)
Asia-Pacific Economic Cooperation (APEC) (as Chinese Taipei)
Central American Bank for Economic Integration (BCIE)
International Chamber of Commerce (ICC) (as Chinese Taipei)
International Olympic Committee (IOC) (as Chinese Taipei)
International Trade Union Confederation (ITUC) (as Chinese Taipei)
World Confederation of Labour (WCL)
World Federation of Trade Unions (WFTU)
World Trade Organization (WTO) (as Separate Customs Territory of Taiwan, Penghu, Kinmen, and Matsu, "Chinese Taipei")

The Republic of China is excluded from:
 United Nations
 The Republic of China was a founding member of the UN, but withdrew in 1971 after the   UNGA Resolution 2758 was proposed which was in favor of representation for the PRC.
 On 23 July 2007, the Republic of China's (15th) request to join the UN was rejected.

Law and order 

 Capital punishment in Taiwan
 Constitution of the Republic of China
 Corporal punishment in Taiwan
 Human rights in Taiwan
 LGBT rights in Taiwan
 Intersex rights in Taiwan
 Freedom of religion in Taiwan
 Identification in Taiwan
 Law enforcement in Taiwan
 Coast Guard Administration
 National Police Agency

Political/legal status of Taiwan
Chinese unification
Political status of Taiwan
Taiwan cession
Taiwan independence

Legal documentation of Taiwan status
Treaty of Shimonoseki
Cairo Conference
Potsdam Declaration
Treaty of Peace with Japan
Treaty of Taipei
General Order No. 1
Japanese Instrument of Surrender
Charter of the United Nations
Yalta Conference
Shanghai Communique

Military 

 Command
 Commander-in-chief: Tsai Ing-wen
 Ministry of National Defense
 Conscription in Taiwan
 Forces
 Republic of China Army
 Republic of China Navy
Republic of China Marine Corps
 Republic of China Air Force
 Republic of China Military Police
 Military ranks of the Republic of China

Politicians 
Annette Lu
John Chang
Morris Chang
Chen Shui-bian
Chiang Ching-kuo
Chiang Kai-shek
Chu Mei-feng
Frank Hsieh
Evonne Hsu
Katsura Taro
Lee Teng-hui
Lee Yuan-tseh
Li Ao
Lien Chan
Ma Ying-jeou
Pai Hsien-yung
Peng Ming-min
James Soong
Sisy Chen
Soong Mei-ling
Su Tseng-chang
Wang Jin-pyng
Wang Yung-ching
Yen Chia-kan
Yu Shyi-kun

History of Taiwan 

 Archaeological sites

February 28 Incident
32 Demands
Kaohsiung Incident
Koxinga
Timeline of Taiwanese history
 Timeline of diplomatic relations of Taiwan

By period

Mainland before 1949
Economic history of China
Military history of China (pre-1911)
List of earthquakes in China

Taiwan
 Prehistory     50000 BCE – 1540 CE
 Dapenkeng culture    4000 BCE – 2500 BCE
 Kingdom of Middag    1540–1732
 Dutch Formosa    1624–1662
 Spanish Formosa    1626–1642
 Kingdom of Tungning     1661–1683
 Qing Taiwan    1683–1895
 Republic of Taiwan    1895
 Japanese Taiwan    1895–1945
Taiwanese Communist Party
 Post-War Taiwan    1945–present
19 March 2004 assassination attempt in Taiwan

By region 
 History of Kaohsiung
 History of Taipei

By subject 
Cultural history
Economic history
Educational history
 Military history of Taiwan
Quemoy Battles
First Taiwan Strait Crisis
Second Taiwan Strait Crisis
Third Taiwan Strait Crisis
Civil Air Transport
Political history

Historical figures
 Rulers of Taiwan
Thomas Barclay (missionary)
George Leslie Mackay
James Laidlaw Maxwell

Culture of Taiwan 

 Architecture of Taiwan
Taipei 101
Sun Yat-sen Memorial Hall
Chung-Shan Building
 Festivals in Taiwan
 Public holidays in Taiwan
 Languages of Taiwan
Taiwanese Mandarin
 Taiwanese Hokkien
 Taiwanese Hakka
Formosan languages
 Media in Taiwan
 Museums in Taiwan
 National symbols of the Republic of China
 Coat of arms of the Republic of China
 Flag of the Republic of China
 National anthem of the Republic of China
 Night markets in Taiwan
 People of Taiwan
Han Taiwanese
 Ethnic minorities in Taiwan
Taiwanese aborigines
Taiwanese American
Notable Taiwanese individuals
Alec Su
Jay Chou
Jolin Tsai
Show Lo
S.H.E
Wang Hsing-ching
A-mei
Teresa Teng
Takeshi Kaneshiro
Mainland Chinese
 Prostitution in Taiwan
 Scenic areas in Taiwan
Jiufen
Cihu Mausoleum
Wuzhi Mountain Military Cemetery
Yangmingshan
 Chinese cuisine
Taiwanese cuisine
Bubble Tea
Suncake
Taiwan Beer
 Taiwanese identity
 Tea culture of Taiwan

Arts in Taiwan 
 Art in Taiwan
 Cinema of Taiwan
Crystal Boys
Cape No. 7
Seediq Bale
 Dance in Taiwan
Cloud Gate Dance Theater
 Literature of Taiwan
 Taiwanese literature movement
Formosa Magazine
 Music of Taiwan
Chiang Kai-shek Memorial Song
 Opera of Taiwan
Photography in Taiwan
 Television in Taiwan
 Taiwanese drama

Mass media of Taiwan 
Media of Taiwan
International Community Radio Taipei
The China Post
Taipei Times
Taiwan News
Public Television Service
TVBS

Museums in Taiwan 
National Palace Museum
Taipei Fine Arts Museum
National Museum of History
Museum of World Religions
New Taipei City Yingge Ceramics Museum
Tamkang University Maritime Museum
Taiwan Nougat Museum
Shung Ye Museum of Formosan Aborigines
Pinglin Tea Industry Museum
National Taiwan Museum
Republic of China Armed Forces Museum
Miniatures Museum of Taiwan

Religion in Taiwan 
 Religion in Taiwan
 Buddhism in Taiwan
Longshan Temple (disambiguation)
 Christianity in Taiwan
Catholic Church in Taiwan
Presbyterian Church in Taiwan
 Islam in Taiwan
 Judaism in Taiwan

Sports in Taiwan 

 Professional baseball in Taiwan - Baseball is the most popular sport in Taiwan.
 Chinese Professional Baseball League
 P. League+ 
 Super Basketball League
 Women's Super Basketball League

Economy and infrastructure of Taiwan 

 Economic rank, by nominal GDP (2021): 21st (twenty-first)
 Agriculture in Taiwan
 Banking in Taiwan
 Central Bank of the Republic of China (Taiwan)
 Communications in Taiwan
 Internet in Taiwan
 Companies of Taiwan
 Currency of Taiwan: dollar
ISO 4217: TWD
 Economic history of Taiwan
 Energy in Taiwan
 Energy policy of Taiwan
 Nuclear power in Taiwan
 Four Asian Tigers
 Health care in Taiwan
 Iron rice bowl
 Taiwan Miracle
 Taiwan Stock Exchange
Taiwan Capitalization Weighted Stock Index
 Tourism in Taiwan
 Transportation in Taiwan
 Air transport in Taiwan
 Airports in Taiwan
China Airlines
EVA Air
Starlux Airlines
Rail transport in Taiwan
Taiwan High Speed Rail
Taiwan Railway Administration
Taipei Metro, New Taipei Metro, Taichung Metro, Taoyuan Metro, Kaohsiung Rapid Transit
 Highway system in Taiwan

Education and research in Taiwan
 History of education in Taiwan
 National Taiwan University
 List of Taiwanese inventions and discoveries
 List of universities in Taiwan
 Intercollegiate Taiwanese American Students Association
 Taiwan studies

Research institutes
Academia Sinica
Chungshan Institute of Science and Technology
Industrial Technology Research Institute
National Health Research Institutes
National Space Organization

Nobel laureates
Yuan T. Lee

See also 

Hong Kong–Taiwan relations
Index of Taiwan-related articles
List of international rankings
Outline of Asia
Outline of geography

References

External links 

 Central Weather Bureau – local weather and earthquake reports
 Satellite view of Taiwan at WikiMapia
 Statistics of Taiwan
 Office of the President
 Control Yuan
 Examination Yuan
 Executive Yuan
 Government Information Office
 Judicial Yuan
 Legislative Yuan
 Ministry of Foreign Affairs
 National Assembly
 Taipei Economic & Cultural Representative Office in the U.S.
 Taiwan e-Government

Taiwan
Taiwan